Emerald Christian Academy, originally called Emerald Junior Academy, is a private Christian school in Pleasant Hill, Oregon, United States. It is affiliated with the Seventh-day Adventist Church. Children from kindergarten to eighth grade may enroll. The first through fourth graders are enrolled in the Accelerated Reader system, and sixth through eighth graders may participate in MathCounts competitions.

The school has been accredited by Cognia (formerly AdvancED) as part of the Northwest Association of Accredited Schools since 1994.

See also
Seventh-day Adventist Church
Seventh-day Adventist education
List of Seventh-day Adventist secondary and elementary schools

References

External links 
 
  

High schools in Lane County, Oregon
Private middle schools in Oregon
Christian schools in Oregon
Private elementary schools in Oregon
Private high schools in Oregon